These are the official results of the Men's Long Jump event at the 2003 World Championships in Paris, France. There were a total number of 36 participating athletes, with the final held on Friday 29 August 2003. The qualification standard was set at 8.15 metres (or at least the best twelve qualified).

Medalists

Schedule
All times are Central European Time (UTC+1)

Abbreviations
All results shown are in metres

Qualification

Final

See also
2003 Long Jump Year Ranking
Athletics at the 2003 Pan American Games - Men's long jump

References
 Results (Archived 2009-05-14)
 todor66

J
Long jump at the World Athletics Championships